The Nocturnes, Op. 9 are a set of three nocturnes for solo piano written by Frédéric Chopin between 1831 and 1832, published in 1832, and dedicated to Madame Marie Pleyel. These were Chopin's first published set of nocturnes. The second nocturne of the work is often regarded as Chopin's most famous piece.

Nocturne in B-flat minor, Op. 9, No. 1 

One of the better known nocturnes, this piece has a rhythmic freedom that came to characterize Chopin's later work. The left hand has an unbroken sequence of eighth notes in simple arpeggios throughout the entire piece, while the right hand moves with freedom, occasionally in patterns of seven, eleven, twenty, and twenty-two in the form of polyrhythms. The piece is 85 measures long and in  meter. It is written in ternary form; after the primary theme, the secondary theme starts in measure 19, followed by a modified version of the primary theme in measure 70.

The opening section moves into a contrasting middle section in the same key signature, which flows back to the opening material in a transitional passage where the melody floats above seventeen consecutive bars of D major chords. The reprise of the first section grows out of this, followed by a Picardy third ending.

Nocturne in E-flat major, Op. 9, No. 2

Chopin composed his best-known Nocturne in E major, Op. 9, No. 2 when he was around twenty years old. This well-known nocturne is in rounded binary form (A, A, B, A, B, A) with coda, C. It is 34 measures long and written in  meter, having a similar structure to a waltz.

The A and B sections become increasingly ornamented with each recurrence. The penultimate bar utilizes considerable rhythmic freedom, indicated by the instruction, senza tempo (without tempo). The nocturne opens with a legato melody, mostly played piano (quietly), containing graceful upward leaps which becomes increasingly wide as the line unfolds. This melody is heard again three times during the piece. With each repetition, it is varied by ever more elaborate decorative tones and trills. The nocturne also includes a subordinate melody, which is played with rubato.

A sonorous foundation for the melodic line is provided by the widely spaced notes in the accompaniment, connected by the damper pedal. The waltz-like accompaniment gently emphasizes the  meter, 12 beats to the measure subdivided into four groups of 3 beats each.

Analysis
 John Rink "Structural momentum and closure in Chopin's Nocturne Op 9 No 2" in Schenker Studies 2 (ed. Carl Schachter, Hedi Siegel) pp102–127 Cambridge University Press, 2006 , .
 Jean-Jacques Eigeldinger "Nocturne op. 9/2, E flat major" in Chopin: pianist and teacher as seen by his pupils (ed. Jean-Jacques Eigeldinger, Roy Howat) pp77–79 Cambridge University Press, 1989 , .
 Eleanor Bailie "Nocturne No. 2 in E flat major" in Chopin: a graded practical guide (Eleanor Bailie, Issue 3 of The pianist's repertoire) pp303–306 Kahn & Averill, 1998 , .

Popular culture

In theatre 
The final dance of the ballet In the Night by Jerome Robbins (1970), was choreographed to this music.

In film 
Op.9 No. 2 was used prominently throughout Bad Santa, 2003 
 No. 2 was used in the film Zero Motivation (2014) and Exodus (1960).
 Used at dinner in the 2018 mystery thriller film We Have Always Lived in the Castle (twice, approx 35 and 61 mins in).

In television 
A puppet show performed by Snoopy featured this song as its music score in the Peanuts television special Be My Valentine, Charlie Brown (1975).
The piece was also played on the final episode of the TV anime Girls' Last Tour
This piece was used in the background of the Season 2 episode of Star vs. the Forces of Evil, "Ludo in the Wild."
The piece was used in the movie The Purge: Anarchy
This piece was used in Always Sunny in Philadelphia episode The Gang Goes to Hell Part 1 and 2
 It was also used at the beginning of the third episode of "The Secret of the Greco Family".
 It was used near the end of the  Baby Einstein video Baby Galileo. The track also appears on the video's soundtrack and corresponding CD.

 Picard, Series 3, episode 1 whilst Picard, Riker, Shaw and Seven of Nine are eating dinner (29 minutes in).

In Competitions 
 Russian Rhythmic Gymnast, Yana Kudryavtseva, used this song for her ball routine, winning her the All-Around Champion title in the 2013 Rhythmic Gymnastics World Championships in Kiev, Ukraine. And also making her the youngest gymnast to ever win the All-Around Title at the World Championships, at only 15 years old.
 Japanese Figure Skater, Mao Asada, used this song for her Short Program twice during her career, during the 2006–07 and 2013-14 Figure Skating seasons. At the 2007 World Figure Skating Championships held in Tokyo, Japan, she won the silver medal, whereas at the 2014 World Figure Skating Championships held in Saitama, Japan, she set a new world record for the Short Program performance, and also won the championship.-->

In games
Op.9 No. 2 was used in 2015 post-apocalypic game, Fallout 4 in Classical Radio.

Nocturne in B major, Op. 9, No. 3 

The piece is in ternary form A–B–A. The first section is marked Allegretto. The main theme is chromatic, but filled with nostalgic energy. The second contrasting section, Agitato in B minor, is a very dramatic one with a combined melody and counter-melody in the right hand and continuous eighth note arpeggios in the left, which requires an amount of virtuosity. The piece is full of coloratura ornaments, and it ends in a small cadenza similar to Opus 9 no. 2, with a wide chord in the left hand accompanied with right hand triplets in a high octave, followed by an arpeggiated ending in B major.

References

External links 
 
 

 Free sheet music of the Nocturnes, on Cantorion.org
 . 
 Hear the performance of the Op. 9 No. 2 Nocturne with original cadenzas  at The Chopin Project

09
1832 compositions
Compositions in B-flat minor
Compositions in E-flat major
Compositions in B major
Music with dedications

ja:夜想曲第1番 (ショパン)
ja:夜想曲第3番 (ショパン)